Alveolaria may refer to:
 Alveolaria (bryozoan), a fossil genus of bryozoans in the family Cerioporidae
 Alveolaria (fungus), a genus of funguses in the family Pucciniosiraceae
 Alveolaria, a genus of polychaetes in the family Sabellariidae, synonym of Sabellaria